Ryan Blake (born February 4, 1966) is the Director of Scouting for the National Basketball Association (NBA) and a former professional tennis player from the United States.

Biography
Blake played collegiate tennis with Georgia Southern University, while studying for a degree in journalism. After graduating he competed on the professional tennis circuit for several years. Most notably, he qualified for the singles main draw at the 1994 Australian Open, with wins over Gilad Bloom, Tom Kempers and Louis Gloria. He was beaten by 16th seed Arnaud Boetsch in the first round. His three main draw appearances on the ATP Tour were all in doubles, at Schenectady in 1993, then Atlanta in both 1997 and 2000.

With his appointment as Director of Scouting for the NBA he followed in the footsteps of his father Marty Blake, former general manager of the Atlanta Hawks and himself an NBA scouting director.

Married with two children, Blake currently lives near Atlanta. He is a drummer in the band The Other White Meat.

References

External links
 
 

1966 births
Living people
American basketball scouts
American male tennis players
Georgia Southern Eagles
Tennis people from Georgia (U.S. state)
National Basketball Association scouts
College men's tennis players in the United States